Trevor John Laughlin (born 30 January 1951) is a former Australian cricketer who played in three Test matches and six One Day Internationals from 1978 to 1979.

In addition, Laughlin was also an Australian rules footballer who played for Mordialloc Football Club in the Victorian Football Association (VFA).

Laughlin's son Ben has also played international cricket for Australia.

References

Sources
 Atkinson, G. (1982) Everything you ever wanted to know about Australian rules football but couldn't be bothered asking, The Five Mile Press: Melbourne. .

1951 births
Living people
Australia Test cricketers
Australia One Day International cricketers
Victoria cricketers
Australian cricketers
Mordialloc Football Club players
Cricketers from Victoria (Australia)